Myrtle Sharon Mary Augee (born 4 February 1965 in Greenwich, Greater London) is a female retired English shot putter. Augee now works as a custodial manager in a prison and received an MBE in the Queen’s 2009 birthday honours list.

Athletics career
Augee represented Great Britain in the 1988 Summer Olympics and 1992 Summer Olympics.

She competed at four Commonwealth Games and won a medal on all four occasions. Representing England in 1986 she won a bronze medal, at the 1986 Commonwealth Games in Edinburgh, Scotland. Four years later she represented England and won a gold medal, at the 1990 Commonwealth Games in Auckland, New Zealand. This was followed by a silver medal, at the 1994 Commonwealth Games in Victoria, British Columbia, Canada. The final appearance was when she represented England and won another silver, at the 1998 Commonwealth Games in Kuala Lumpur, Malaysia.

Her personal best put was 19.03 metres, achieved in June 1990 in Cardiff placing her second on the British outdoor list, behind Judy Oakes. She was also a World Champion in powerlifting, and a World Championship medalist in weightlifting. She was the last British lifter to win an overall weightlifting medal until Sarah Davies won silver in 2021.

Achievements in athletics

References

 sports-reference
 

1965 births
Living people
Female powerlifters
Athletes (track and field) at the 1988 Summer Olympics
Athletes (track and field) at the 1992 Summer Olympics
Athletes (track and field) at the 1986 Commonwealth Games
Athletes (track and field) at the 1990 Commonwealth Games
Athletes (track and field) at the 1994 Commonwealth Games
Athletes (track and field) at the 1998 Commonwealth Games
Athletes (track and field) at the 2002 Commonwealth Games
Olympic athletes of Great Britain
World Athletics Championships athletes for Great Britain
English female weightlifters
English female shot putters
Commonwealth Games medallists in athletics
Commonwealth Games gold medallists for England
Commonwealth Games silver medallists for England
Commonwealth Games bronze medallists for England
Medallists at the 1986 Commonwealth Games
Medallists at the 1990 Commonwealth Games
Medallists at the 1994 Commonwealth Games
Medallists at the 1998 Commonwealth Games